João de Brito (born 1958) is a Portuguese-American artist who has lived in Northern California since 1978, yet he travels extensively throughout California, the U.S. and Europe to paint in oils en plein air and from memory. From age 6, he has observed and studied art to acquire a passion for expressing himself using impressionist/figurative views on canvas.

Though de Brito sculpts and works in ceramic, he favors painting and incorporates his Portuguese roots along with influences of great French fauvists and California impressionists. In previous years, de Brito traveled to New Zealand to paint with Māori artists.

Joao de Brito has become well known for his use of vibrant colors that elicit light, life, energy and interpretive landscapes. Having unleashed a fresh creativity – inspired by memories of his homeland, scenes from his many travels abroad – de Brito’s oils stimulate the sense of sight to produce emotion and thought. As a result, de Brito’s works appear in galleries, museums, businesses, government agencies and affluent homes around the world.

Joao was born in Vila Franca do Campo, São Miguel Island in the Azores, Portugal and as a young boy immigrated with his family to the East Coast of the United States. In 1978, the artist settled on California’s Monterey Peninsula where he shares his talents with the local community as well as international art enthusiasts. Though he admits to often ‘swimming against the current', his painting philosophy is to awaken hope, invoke a sense of well-being and share colors of life, de Brito is content to quietly observe nature and to allow his images to speak to the human heart.

Along the way, he has had many solo exhibits, he's also been member of several art's organizations, the Santa Cruz Art League, Art Association and Museum and The Beachcombers Club. Joao de Brito’s works have been found at Kate Nolan Santa Cruz, California, Thanassi Gallery in Provincetown Cape Cod, Massachusetts, Monique Arnon Fine Arts Gallery San Francisco, the Hauk Fine Art Gallery Pacific Grove, CA and the Santa Cruz Art Center Gallery, in Santa Cruz, The Foundry Gallery, Berkeley and The Woodside Gallery, Woodside, California.

He was also part of group exhibit in 2008 with friends Nathan Oliveira, Mel Ramos and John Mattos, The book Ashes to Life- A Portuguese American Story in Art was published for the exhibit, with interviews with all four artist.

Memberships
The Beachcombers Provincetown,
Santa Cruz Art League,
Provincetown Art Association and Museum

References

Karlstrom, Paul (Portuguese by Julia Pedreira-Lewis) (2008). "Ashes to Life: A Portuguese American Story in Art", 132.
Teves, Paulo & Rita M. Dias (Editors) (2008). "Construir Cultura (Portuguese)", 196.
Goulart, Tony (Project Coordinator ) (2008). "Capelinhos - A Volcano of Synergies: Azorean Emigration to America", 473.
American University Museum at the Katzen Arts Center (2008). "Global Warming - Calentamiento Global: XVII Ibero-American Art Salon", 44.
Antczak, Stephen (translation by Julia Pedreira-Lewis) (2006). "Paths of Life/Passos da Vida", 24.
Brito, Joao (2003). "Colors of Life", 24.
The Exuberant Images of Joao de Brito, Provincetown Magazine,

External links
 
 Story about joao from writer Steven Hauk redroom.com blog
 Exhibit of California Artists sanchezartcenter.org
portuguesefoundation.org
 Store about Joao de Brito works heraldnews.com
rtp.pt
 Portuguese story about Joao portuguesetimes.com
bristolcc.edu
 Listing of Publications where Joao works and story have appeared and auction prices askart.com
artbusiness.com
provincetownartguide.com
Article about Joao

1958 births
Living people
20th-century American painters
Brito, Joao
Brito, Joao
21st-century American painters
21st-century American male artists
American male painters
Brito, Joao
Brito, Joao
Portuguese male painters